The Basketball competitions at the 2017 Southeast Asian Games in Kuala Lumpur took place from 20 to 26 August at MABA Stadium in Kuala Lumpur. 

The 2017 Games featured competitions in two events.

Competition schedule
The following was the competition schedule for the basketball competitions:

Participation

Participating nations

Men's competition

Preliminary round

Group A

Group B

Knockout round

Women's competition

Medal summary

Medal table

Medalists

See also
Wheelchair basketball at the 2017 ASEAN Para Games

References

External links